The boys' 200 metre breaststroke event at the 2018 Summer Youth Olympics took place on 10 October at the Natatorium in Buenos Aires, Argentina.

Results

Heats
The heats were started at 10:25.

Final

The final was held at 18:15.

References

Swimming at the 2018 Summer Youth Olympics